This list of University of Chicago Booth School of Business alumni consists of notable people who graduated or attended the University of Chicago Booth School of Business (Chicago Booth), formerly known as the University of Chicago Graduate School of Business. The business school was renamed in 2008 in honor of the $300 million gift made by David G. Booth. Chicago Booth has over 49,000 alumni.

Banking and financial services
 Roger Altman, chairman, co-CEO and co-founder of Evercore Partners; former vice chairman of The Blackstone Group; former Deputy U.S. Treasury Secretary under the Clinton administration; former Assistant U.S. Treasury Secretary under the Carter administration
 Andrew Alper, President of the New York City Economic Development Corporation, youngest Goldman Sachs partner in company history, university trustee
 Martin Blessing, former CEO of Commerzbank and board member of UBS
 Archie R. Boe, former chairman and CEO of the Allstate Corporation
 Jon Corzine, former CEO of Goldman Sachs, former governor of New Jersey
 Brady Dougan, former CEO of Credit Suisse Group
 Joe Mansueto, chairman and CEO of Morningstar, Inc.
 Philip J. Purcell, former chairman and CEO of Morgan Stanley, and current president of Continental Investors
 Pete Ricketts, vice-chairman of Ameritrade and candidate for the U.S. Senate in Nebraska
 Thomas S. Ricketts, CEO of Incapital LLC; family trust was selected as winning bidder for the Chicago Cubs
 Robert Steel, CEO of Wachovia; former Under Secretary of the U.S. Treasury for domestic finance; former vice chairman of Goldman Sachs
 Joel Stern, CEO of Stern Stewart & Co and developer of Economic value added concept
 Eric Gleacher, the founder chairman of Gleacher & Co.
 Susan Wagner, co-founder and former COO of Blackrock, board member of Apple Inc.
 Jaithirth Rao, founder and former CEO of the software company MphasiS
Barry F. Sullivan, former chairman and CEO of First Chicago Corporation, deputy mayor of New York City under David Dinkins, chairman of the university board of trustees
Dennis Chookaszian is an American businessman and former Chairman and CEO of CNA Insurance.
 Andrew Durke, COO of OBOR Capital
 Kathryn Mikells, CFO of ExxonMobil

Private equity
 William E. Conway, Jr., founding partner and managing director of The Carlyle Group
 Marcel Erni, billionaire co-founder of Partners Group
 James M. Kilts, founding partner of Centerview Partners; former chairman, president, and CEO of Gillette Company
 Eric Kriss, co-founder of Bain Capital.
 Peter G. Peterson, founder and chairman of The Blackstone Group, one of the world's largest buyout firms; U.S. Secretary of Commerce (1972–73); former CEO of Lehman Brothers; co-founder of the Concord Coalition
 Martin Nesbitt, co-founder of The Vistria Group, former national treasurer for the Barack Obama campaign, chairman of the Barack Obama Foundation
 Joseph Nolan, senior partner of GTCR with $8 billion under management
 Byron D. Trott, managing partner and chief investment officer of BDT Capital Partners, former vice chairman of investment banking for Goldman Sachs and head of their Chicago Office and Mid-West region.
 Jon Winkelried, CEO of TPG Capital and former COO of Goldman Sachs
 Frederico Miotti Wiesel, Spectra Investments’ prominent investor in Latin America illiquid markets

Investment management
 Myron Scholes, co-founder of Long-Term Capital Management, co-developer of the Black–Scholes model, co-recipient of the 1997 Nobel Memorial Prize in Economic Sciences.
 Clifford S. Asness, founder of AQR Capital, firm with $170+ billion under management; previously with Goldman Sachs as director of Quantitative Research
 David G. Booth, co-founder and CEO of Dimensional Fund Advisors
 Mark Carhart, portfolio manager of Goldman Sachs $8 billion hedge fund called Global Alpha
Amy Cooper, former insurance portfolio manager at Franklin Templeton
 Eugene Fama, "Father of the efficient-market hypothesis", Nobel Laureate in Economics, professor at the Booth School of Business, co-founder of Dimensional Fund Advisors and co-developer of the Fama–French three-factor model, the Research Papers in Economics project ranked him as the seventh-most influential economist of all-time based on his academic contributions.
 Diane Garnick, chief income strategist of TIAA
 Joseph Hill, managing principal of hedge fund Halcyon
 Roger G. Ibbotson, founder of Ibbotson Associates
 Daniel Ivascyn, CIO of PIMCO
 Michael Larson (businessman), investment manager of Bill Gates
 Howard Marks (investor), co-founder and chairman of Oaktree Capital Management, investment firm with $77 billion under management
 John Meriwether, founder and CEO of JWM Partners; founder of Long-Term Capital Management.
 Victor Niederhoffer, former Hedge fund manager for George Soros, champion squash player.
 Emmanuel Roman, CEO of PIMCO and former CEO of Man Group
 Rex Sinquefield, co-founder along with David G. Booth and Eugene Fama of Dimensional Fund Advisors.
 John Studzinski, Vice Chairman of PIMCO, former Vice Chairman of The Blackstone Group, former Head of the European investment banking division and Deputy Chairman of Morgan Stanley

Marketing
 Bart Becht, former CEO of Reckitt Benckiser
 Debra Crew, president and COO of R. J. Reynolds Tobacco Company
 J. Patrick Doyle, CEO of Domino's Pizza
 Melvin Goodes, retired chairman and CEO of Warner-Lambert
 Scott Griffith, CEO of Zipcar
 Charles M. Harper, former chairman and CEO of ConAgra Foods, Inc.
 Timothy E. Hoeksema, chairman, president and CEO of Midwest Airlines
 Mark Hoplamazian (MBA 1989), president and CEO of Hyatt Hotels Corporation
 Porter Jarvis (MBA), president, then chairman of Swift & Co., 1955–1967; trustee of the University of Chicago
 David Johnson, former president and CEO of Campbell Soup Company
 James M. Kilts, vice chairman of Procter & Gamble and former chairman, CEO, and president, The Gillette Company
 Philip Kotler, author of textbook "Marketing Management: Analysis, Planning, Implementation and Control", received his master's degree in economics and did post-doctoral work in behavioral science at the University of Chicago
 Robert W. Lane, former chairman and CEO of John Deere
 Mark Loughridge, CFO of IBM
 Dave MacLennan, president and CEO of Cargill
 Joseph Neubauer (MBA 1965), chairman and CEO of ARAMARK Corporation
Daniel Ninivaggi, CEO of Lordstown Motors, Chairman of Garrett Motion, former CEO of Icahn Enterprises and Federal-Mogul
 Thomas Pritzker, executive chairman of Hyatt Hotels Corporation
 Peer M. Schatz, CEO of Qiagen
 Frederick D. Sulcer, vice chairman DDB Worldwide, wrote Put a Tiger in Your Tank for ExxonMobil
 Dylan Taylor (executive), United States CEO of Colliers International
 John S. Watson, chairman and CEO of Chevron Corporation
 Ray G. Young, CFO and EVP GMC

Government / public service / non-profit
 Andrew Alper, former president of the New York City Economic Development Corporation
 Roger C. Altman, former Deputy United States Secretary of the Treasury under the President Bill Clinton administration; former Assistant United States Secretary of the Treasury under the President Jimmy Carter administration; chairman, co-CEO and co-founder of Evercore Partners, a leading M&A advisory investment bank; former vice chairman of The Blackstone Group
 Elizabeth H. Bradley, eleventh president of Vassar College
 Jon Corzine '73, governor of New Jersey, and former CEO of Goldman Sachs
 Dirk J. Debbink, United States Navy vice admiral and head of the United States Navy Reserve
 Arnold Donald, president and CEO of the Juvenile Diabetes Research Foundation
 Don Harmon, President of the Illinois Senate
 Ron Huberman, CEO of Chicago Public Schools, previously president of the Chicago Transit Authority
 Mark Villar, Senator of the Philippines (2022-present), Secretary of Public Works and Highways (2016-2021), member of the House of Representatives from Las Pinas (2010-2016)
 Christina Liu (MBA, PhD), former finance minister of Taiwan (2012)
 Jack Markell, 1985, Governor of Delaware
 Peter G. Peterson, (1972–73) U.S. Secretary of Commerce; chairman of The Blackstone Group
 Charles Plosser, president and CEO of the Federal Reserve Bank of Philadelphia
 Steven Preston, U.S. Secretary of Housing and Urban Development, U.S. Administrator of the Small Business Administration
 Pete Ricketts, Governor of Nebraska
 Emil Skodon, US Ambassador to Brunei Darussalam
 Beryl Wayne Sprinkel, chairman of the Council of Economic Advisors, 1985-1989
 Robert K. Steel, former Under Secretary for Domestic Finance within the United States Department of the Treasury; former CEO of Wachovia Bank (2008–2010); former vice-chairman of Goldman Sachs
 Katerina Chumachenko Yushchenko, first lady of Ukraine
 Erroll Davis, 1967, Superintendent of Atlanta Public Schools
 Todd Young, 2000, U.S. Senator from Indiana
Krishnamurthy Subramanian, 17th Chief Economic Adviser to the Government of India

Technology
 Dan Caruso, founder and CEO of Zayo Group Holdings
 Bryan Johnson, founder of Braintree, OS Fund and Kernel
 David Lawee, head of corporate development at Google
 Mark Loughridge, CFO of IBM
 Matt Maloney,  co-founder and CEO of GrubHub 
 Satya Nadella, CEO at Microsoft
 Karen Sheriff, president and CEO of Q9 Networks Inc.
 Robert Whittington, chief information officer at Wendy's
 Dhiraj Rajaram, founder and CEO of Mu-Sigma
 George Conrades, former chairman and CEO of Akamai Technologies
 John R. Opel, former chairman and CEO of IBM
 John Dilenschneider, owner of sold companies ICG, WebQA, FOIA Systems, GovQA and others.

Venture capital
 John Hershey, managing director of Hercules Technology Growth Capital; formerly managing director of Infinity Capital and of the technology group at Banc of America Securities
 Robert McCormack, co-founder and Advisory Director, Trident Capital
 Mark Suster, investment partner at Upfront Ventures (formerly GRP Partners). Prominent blogger
 Richard H. Kimball, co-founder and general managing partner of Technology Crossover Ventures

Consulting
 James O. McKinsey, founder of McKinsey & Company
 Horacio D. Rozanski, CEO of Booz Allen Hamilton
 Harold L. Sirkin, senior partner of The Boston Consulting Group (BCG) and adviser to President Barack Obama

Journalism/publishing/media
 Megan McArdle, economics journalist and blogger, formerly at Atlantic Monthly, now with Bloomberg 
 Sara Paretsky, novelist and creator of the V.I. Warshawski mystery series

Sports and entertainment
 Mike Girsch, general manager of the St. Louis Cardinals 
 Jay Rasulo, CFO of The Walt Disney Company
 Craig Robinson '92, head basketball coach at Oregon State University, brother-in-law of former US President Barack Obama
 Jason Wright, president of the Washington Football Team and former NFL running back

References

 
University of Chicago Booth School of Business alumni